Cottonwood Butte is a mountain and modest ski area in the western United States, located in north central Idaho, west of nearby Cottonwood.

Ski area
The slopes are on the northeast flank of the mountain, served by two surface lifts: a T-bar and a rope tow.

The ski area opened  in 1967, although skiing had previously taken place on the mountain with portable 

The area operates from 10 am to 4 pm on weekends and holidays, and Friday nights (6–10 pm) in January.

Radar station
During the Cold War, the mountain was the site of Cottonwood Air Force Station, an early warning radar installation of the U.S. Air Force. The project was made public in 1955, construction began in 1956, and it went operational in early 1959. The 27-unit family housing area was built in the city of Cottonwood, on Butte Drive in the north end.

The radar was significantly upgraded with a new tower in 1962, but the station was obsolete within three years and was

Job Corps
The buildings of the cantonment became a Job Corps center in 1965, supervised by the U.S. Forest Service.

Correctional facility
After nine years, the Job Corps center was transferred to the state of Idaho in 1974, and was converted to the minimum-security North Idaho Correctional Institution (NICI).

The state's department of lands built a fire lookout at the summit, which also supports various communications towers.

Video
Cottonwood Butte

References

External links
 Cottonwood Butte.org – ski area
 Go-Idaho.com – Cottonwood Butte
 Visit Idaho.org – Cottonwood Butte
 Ski Map.org – trail maps – Cottonwood Butte
 Ski Idaho – Cottonwood Butte

 Idaho Ski Resorts.com – Cottonwood Butte

Ski areas and resorts in Idaho
Landforms of Idaho County, Idaho
Buildings and structures in Idaho County, Idaho
Tourist attractions in Idaho County, Idaho
Year of establishment missing